Bonnie "Prince" Billy is a studio EP by Will Oldham. It was released under the moniker Bonnie "Prince" Billy in 2013.

Track listing

Personnel
Credits adapted from liner notes.

 Will Oldham – music
 Timothy Stollenwerk – mastering

References

External links
 

2013 albums
Will Oldham albums